Ramzi Toufic Salamé (born July 17, 1953 in Lebanon) is a writer and painter of Lebanese origin.

Biography 

Salamé's parents were Lebanese immigrants in Liberia, but his early years were spent in Lebanon. He studied management studies at the American University of Beirut and law at the Saint Joseph University.

Literary career 

He wrote the following works in French. They have been translated into Arabic.

 Le Prince des cyniques, édition FMA, Buchet Chastel, 1999 
 Trésor, édition FMA, 2003 
 La pierre m'a parlé, édition FMA, L'Harmattan, 2005 
 La Caste supérieure, édition FMA, L'Harmattan, 2007 
 La République des Paysans, édition FMA, L'Harmattan, 2011

His novels criticize a society dominated by selfishness and careerism where man is managed by his instincts of power and domination. His writing is "simple and straightforward. He relies heavily on dialogue to convey his ideas, rather than narration or description". His work is a historical study in the guise of a novel.

Salamé has listed Gerard Mordillat, Sun Tse, Jacques Baudouin and Guillaume Musso as his literary influences.

Art 

Salamé's paintings depict serene nature in cheerful and lively colors, in a personal and naive style.

He has exhibited in Lebanon, Paris, Switzerland and Belgium.

References 

Living people
Lebanese artists
Artists from Beirut
1953 births
Lebanese emigrants to Liberia
Writers from Beirut